Jurgen Wevers (born 12 January 1979 in Winterswijk, Gelderland) is a Dutch professional footballer who currently plays for FC Oss. Wevers plays as a goalkeeper. He formerly played for De Graafschap and RKC Waalwijk.

External links
 

1979 births
Living people
People from Winterswijk
Dutch footballers
De Graafschap players
RKC Waalwijk players
TOP Oss players
Eredivisie players
Eerste Divisie players
Association football goalkeepers
Footballers from Gelderland